East Shore is a census-designated place (CDP) in Plumas County, California, United States. The population was 156 at the 2010 census, down from 177 at the 2000 census.

Geography
East Shore is located along the south-east shoreline of Lake Almanor, at  (40.242583, -121.077361).

Demographics

2010
At the 2010 census East Shore had a population of 156. The racial makeup of East Shore was 143 (91.7%) White, 0 (0.0%) African American, 7 (4.5%) Native American, 1 (0.6%) Asian, 0 (0.0%) Pacific Islander, 5 (3.2%) from other races, and 0 (0.0%) from two or more races. Hispanic or Latino of any race were 7 people (4.5%).

The whole population lived in households, no one lived in non-institutionalized group quarters and no one was institutionalized.

There were 78 households, 7 (9.0%) had children under the age of 18 living in them, 56 (71.8%) were opposite-sex married couples living together, 0 (0%) had a female householder with no husband present, 0 (0%) had a male householder with no wife present.  There were 2 (2.6%) unmarried opposite-sex partnerships, and 0 (0%) same-sex married couples or partnerships. 19 households (24.4%) were one person and 9 (11.5%) had someone living alone who was 65 or older. The average household size was 2.00.  There were 56 families (71.8% of households); the average family size was 2.34.

The age distribution was 8 people (5.1%) under the age of 18, 6 people (3.8%) aged 18 to 24, 13 people (8.3%) aged 25 to 44, 76 people (48.7%) aged 45 to 64, and 53 people (34.0%) who were 65 or older.  The median age was 60.8 years. For every 100 females, there were 88.0 males.  For every 100 females age 18 and over, there were 94.7 males.

There were 265 housing units at an average density of 224.0 per square mile, of the occupied units 65 (83.3%) were owner-occupied and 13 (16.7%) were rented. The homeowner vacancy rate was 7.1%; the rental vacancy rate was 30.0%.  129 people (82.7% of the population) lived in owner-occupied housing units and 27 people (17.3%) lived in rental housing units.

2000
At the 2000 census there were 177 people, 87 households, and 62 families in the CDP. The racial makeup of the CDP was 92.09% White, 4.52% Native American, 0.56% Asian, 1.69% from other races, and 1.13% from two or more races.  6.21% of the population were Hispanic or Latino of any race.
Of the 87 households 11.5% had children under the age of 18 living with them, 69.0% were married couples living together, 1.1% had a female householder with no husband present, and 27.6% were non-families. 20.7% of households were one person and 8.0% were one person aged 65 or older.  The average household size was 2.03 and the average family size was 2.29.

The age distribution was 10.2% under the age of 18, 3.4% from 18 to 24, 15.3% from 25 to 44, 45.2% from 45 to 64, and 26.0% 65 or older.  The median age was 54 years. For every 100 females, there were 92.4 males.  For every 100 females age 18 and over, there were 93.9 males.

The median household income was $38,125 and the median family income  was $38,906. Males had a median income of $25,781 versus $8,750 for females. The per capita income for the CDP was $18,985.  About 10.8% of families and 16.7% of the population were below the poverty line, including none of those under the age of eighteen or sixty five or over.

Politics

References

Census-designated places in Plumas County, California
Census-designated places in California